Christian Diener (born 3 June 1993) is a German backstroke swimmer. He is living in Potsdam (Germany). Jörg Hoffmann is his coach.

Diener won his first international championship title at European Junior Championships 2010 in 50m backstroke. One year later, in 2011, he defended his gold medal and won also in 100m and 200m backstroke at European Junior Championships in Belgrade (Serbia) and won gold medal at World Junior Championships in Lima (Peru) in 50m backstroke. Christian Diener won silver in 50m backstroke at European Short Course Swimming Championships 2013 and 2014 at European Aquatics Championships. He was member of German team at the 2016 Summer Olympics in Rio de Janeiro and competed in the 200m backstroke, finishing 7th.

Career

Summer Olympics
2016 Summer Olympics in Rio de Janeiro (Brazil)
 Rank 7 in 200m backstroke
2010 Summer Youth Olympics in Singapore
 Bronze in 4 × 100 m European Aquatics Championships (as backstroke swimmer)

World Championships
2015 World Aquatics Championships in Kazan (Russia):
 Rank 9 in 200m backstroke
 Rank 24 in 100m backstroke
2014 Short Course World Swimming Championships in Doha (Qatar)
 Rank 5 in 100m backstroke
 Rank 7 in 4 × 50 m European Aquatics Championships mixed (as backstroke swimmer)
 Rank 8 in 4 × 100 m European Aquatics Championships
 Rank 11 in 200m backstroke
 Rank 13 in 50m backstroke
2014 CISM Military World Championships in Tenero (Switzerland)
 Gold in 200m backstroke (new CISM world record)
 Gold in 100m backstroke
 Gold in 4 × 100 m European Aquatics Championships (as backstroke swimmer)
 Bronze in 50m backstroke
2012 Short Course World Swimming Championships in Istanbul (Turkey)
 Rank 8 in 100m backstroke
 Rank 8 in 200m backstroke
 Rank in 15 in 50m backstroke
2011 World Junior Championships in Lima (Peru)
 Gold in 50m backstroke (new World Junior Championships Record)
2009 ISF World Schools Championships in Antalya (Turkey)
 Gold in 50m backstroke
 Gold in 4 × 50 m European Aquatics Championships (as backstroke swimmer)
 Gold in 6 × 50 m freestyle relay
 Silver in 50m butterfly

European Championships
2014 European Aquatics Championships in Berlin (Germany)
 Silver in 200m backstroke
 Rank 4 in 100m backstroke
2013 European Short Course Swimming Championships in Herning (Denmark)
 Gold in 4 × 50 m medley relay mixed (as backstroke swimmer)
 Silver in 50m backstroke
 Bronze in 200m backstroke
 Bronze in 4 × 50 m medley relay (as backstroke swimmer)
 Rank 5 in 100m backstroke
2012 European Short Course Swimming Championships in Chartres (France):
 Rank 4 in 200m backstroke
 Rank 5 in 50m backstroke
 Rank 6 in 100m backstroke
 Rank 6 in 4 × 50 m medley relay Mixed
2012 European Aquatics Championships in Debrecen (Hungary)
 Rank 9 in 50m backstroke
 Rank 15 in 200m Rücken
 Rank 17 in 100m Rücken
2011 European Short Course Swimming Championships in Szczecin (Poland)
 Bronze in 4 × 50 m medley relay (as backstroke swimmer)
 Rank 4 in 50m backstroke
 Rank 6 in 100m backstroke
2011 European Junior Swimming Championships in Belgrad (Serbia)
 Gold in 50m backstroke (mit Deutschen Altersklassenrekord und JEM-Rekord)
 Gold in 100m backstroke
 Gold in 200m backstroke
 Silver in 4 × 100 m European Aquatics Championships (as backstroke swimmer)
2010 European Junior Swimming Championships in Helsinki (Finland)
 Gold in 50m Rücken
 Bronze in 4 × 100 m medley relay (as backstroke swimmer)

German National Championships
2014 German National Short Course Championships in Wuppertal (Germany)
 Gold in 50m backstroke
 Gold in 100m backstroke
 Gold in 200m backstroke
 Gold in 4 × 50 m freestyle relay
 Gold in 4 × 50 m medley relay (as backstroke swimmer)

2014 German National Championships in Berlin (Germany)
 Silver in 100m backstroke
 Silver in 200m backstroke
 Bronze in 50m backstroke

2013 German National Short Course Championships in Wuppertal (Germany)
 Gold in 50m backstroke
 Gold in 100m backstroke
 Gold in 200m backstroke

2012 German National Championships in Berlin (Germany)
 Rank 4 in 100m backstroke
 Rank 4 in 200m backstroke

2011 German National Short Course Championships in Wuppertal (Germany)
 Gold in 50m backstroke
 Gold in 100m backstroke
 Gold in 200m backstroke

2011 German National Championships in Berlin (Germany)
 Silver in 50m backstroke

2010 German National Short Course Championships in Wuppertal (Germany)
 Silver in 50m backstroke

References

External links 
 
 
 

1993 births
Living people
Male backstroke swimmers
German male swimmers
Swimmers at the 2010 Summer Youth Olympics
Olympic swimmers of Germany
Swimmers at the 2016 Summer Olympics
European Aquatics Championships medalists in swimming
Sportspeople from Cottbus
Swimmers at the 2020 Summer Olympics
Medalists at the FINA World Swimming Championships (25 m)
20th-century German people
21st-century German people